HCLS may refer to:

Hall County Library System
Henry County Library System